Vimaladharmasūriya is a Sinhala regnal name. It may refer to:

 Vimaladharmasuriya I of Kandy (1590–1604), King of Kandy from the House of Dinajara
 Vimaladharmasuriya II of Kandy (1687–1707), King of Kandy from the House of Dinajara

Sinhalese names